Indian Summer School is a 2018 Channel 4 docuseries in which five British boys, who have failed their GCSEs, are invited to attend the Indian all-boys boarding school The Doon School, described in the show as the "Eton of India"  (though the school eschews the label). The three-part miniseries was produced by Naked Entertainment, and originally aired in March–April 2018 on Channel 4.

Episodes
In the show, five working class boys, Jack, Alfie, Jake, Ethan and Harry, are given a chance to reform their academic performance, based on the premise that an all-round education in an ethnically-diverse environment at one of the world's best schools will prove beneficial. Matthew Raggett, the school's headmaster, believes the boys' lives can be turned around in six months at the school, which has the exam pass rate of 100%.

References

External links
Homepage
The Guardian review
The Telegraph review
Ethan's article (pg.3) in The Doon School Weekly
 

2018 British television series debuts
2018 British television series endings
2010s British documentary television series
2010s British LGBT-related television series
2010s British teen television series
2010s British television miniseries
2010s high school television series
British high school television series
Channel 4 documentaries
English-language television shows
Television series by Fremantle (company)
Television series about teenagers
Television shows set in Uttarakhand
The Doon School